James W. Ladd (July 29, 1932 – November 13, 1996) was an American football end who played for the Chicago Cardinals (now known as the Arizona Cardinals). He had multiple stints with the team but only played in 1954. He went to college at Bowling Green. He was drafted in the 20th round (234th overall) by the Chicago Bears in 1954. In his NFL career, he played in 11 games, and had 22 catches for 254 yards.

References

External links
Jim Ladd College Basketball Stats – via Sports Reference
Jim Ladd Career Stats NFL.com

Further reading

1932 births
1996 deaths
American football ends
Chicago Cardinals players
Bowling Green Falcons football players
Bowling Green Falcons men's basketball players
People from Ottawa County, Ohio
Players of American football from Ohio